Melanarctia is a genus of moths in the family Erebidae. The genus was described by Watson in 1975.

Species
 Melanarctia lativitta (Rothschild, 1909)
 Melanarctia ockendeni (Rothschild, 1909)

References

Phaegopterina
Moth genera